I Am Sebastian Ott is a 1939 German crime film directed by Willi Forst and starring Forst, Gustav Diessl and Trude Marlen. Some of the film was shot by the assistant director Viktor Becker.

The film's sets were designed by the art director Kurt Herlth and Werner Schlichting. It was shot partly at the Sievering Studios in Vienna. It premiered at the Gloria-Palast in Berlin shortly before the outbreak of the Second World War.

The plot revolves around art fraud with Forst playing the dual role of twins, one honest and the other corrupt.

Cast
 Willi Forst as Sebastian Ott / Ludwig Ott
 Gustav Diessl as Strobl
 Trude Marlen as Erika
 Paul Hörbiger as Kriminalrat Baumann
 Ady Berber as Meinhardt, Ganove
 Lorenz Corvinus as Geheimrat bei der Ausstellung
 Felix Dombrowsky as Kriminalkommissar
 Richard Eybner as Schmiedl
 Pepi Glöckner-Kramer as Marie, Mädchen bei Holzapfel
 Hanns Hitzinger as Justizrat Norden
 Reinhold Häussermann as Professor Nissen
 Eduard Köck as Eberle, Faktoturn in der Galerie Ott
 Ferdinand Mayerhofer as Kriminalkommissar Hellriegl
 Alfred Neugebauer as Dr. Nemetz, Kriminalrat in Prag
 Fritz Puchstein as Sekretär
 Johannes Roth as Kellner
 Werner Scharf as Paolini
 Wilhelm Schich as Schneider
 Otto Storm as Bankdirektor
 Otto Treßler as Oberst Holzapfel
 Robert Valberg as Prosecutor in Kopenhagen

References

Bibliography

External links 
 

1939 films
1939 crime films
German crime films
Films of Nazi Germany
1930s German-language films
Films directed by Willi Forst
German black-and-white films
Bavaria Film films
Films shot at Sievering Studios
1930s German films